The Trip is a 2010 British television sitcom series and feature film directed by Michael Winterbottom, starring Steve Coogan and Rob Brydon as fictionalised versions of themselves on a restaurant tour of northern England. The series was edited into feature film format and premiered at the Toronto International Film Festival in September 2010. The full series was first broadcast on BBC Two and BBC HD in the United Kingdom in November 2010. Both the TV series and film received very positive reviews.

Three further series followed. The Trip to Italy was broadcast on BBC Two in 2014, The Trip to Spain was filmed in 2016 and broadcast on Sky Atlantic in 2017, and The Trip to Greece was filmed in 2019 and aired on Sky One in 2020. Like the first series, the second, third and fourth were each edited into feature films. Winterbottom, Coogan and Brydon stated that The Trip to Greece would be the final series for the show.

Origins
Coogan and Brydon's roles as fictionalised versions of themselves are a continuation of their improvised performances in the film A Cock and Bull Story (2005), also directed by Michael Winterbottom. In an interview with The Guardian, Coogan said he and Brydon exaggerated "the aspects of ourselves that help the comedy ...  I like playing with the fact that it might be me, to give it a bit more edge. So some of the conversations with Rob are funny, but some of them are very uncomfortable. They're sort of genuine arguments. It's a sort of an exaggeration of real life."

Cast
Steve Coogan as Steve Coogan
Rob Brydon as Rob Brydon
Claire Keelan as Emma, Steve's assistant who joins each of the trips for at least a few days
Rebecca Johnson as Sally, Rob's wife
Tim Leach as Joe, Steve's son, with whom he has a distant relationship that they gradually mend throughout the series
Marta Barrio as Yolanda, a photographer who accompanies Emma, and has a casual relationship with Steve
Margo Stilley as Mischa, Steve's American girlfriend who breaks up with him in the first series

Plot
In an effort to save his relationship with his gourmet girlfriend, Mischa (Margo Stilley), actor Steve Coogan accepts a commission from The Observer to go on a restaurant tour of northern England. When Mischa insists they take a break from their relationship, Steve invites colleague and frenemy Rob Brydon. On the trip, Coogan has a number of one-night stands, but is miserable professionally and personally, despite being the bigger star; Brydon, with his young family, is more content and laid-back. The two argue and attempt to one-up and humiliate each other with their impersonations of celebrities including Michael Caine and Sean Connery.

In the second series, Rob and Steve are commissioned to do another restaurant tour, this time in Italy from Piedmont to Capri, following in the footsteps of the great Romantic poets in the early 19th century on the Grand Tour. While on the tour, Rob wins a part in an American Michael Mann film. Steve reconnects with his estranged son, Joe, who briefly joins the two towards the end of their trip.

In the third series, Rob and Steve are commissioned to do another restaurant tour, this time in Spain.

The fourth series is set in Greece where Rob and Steve conduct a restaurant tour that follows the path of the Odyssey.

Episodes

Overview

Series 1: The Trip (2010)

Series 2: The Trip to Italy (2014)

Series 3: The Trip to Spain (2017)

Series 4: The Trip to Greece (2020)

Other 

The concept was revived for The Big Night In, a 20 April 2020 telethon held during the COVID-19 pandemic, in a skit which had the pair conducting a video call from their homes to discuss making a segment for the telethon.

Reception
The Trip received positive reviews. Andrea Mullaney of The Scotsman said that "on paper, The Trip sounds bloody awful: a cosy, luvvie giant in-joke for Steve Coogan and Rob Brydon", but went on to describe it as "completely brilliant" and "hilarious". Brian Viner of The Independent said: "The Trip never fails to oblige. I love it for its originality and its daring." John Crace of The Guardian described the show as "one of the funniest things on TV." Director Richard Curtis described the series as one of the greatest television programmes of all time at the 2013 British Comedy Awards. It was nominated, in 2011, for the BAFTA Television Award for Best Situation Comedy, and Steve Coogan won the award for Best Male Comedy Performance. It won the Best New Programme award at the 2012 Broadcast Awards in London. In 2018, Rob Brydon was nominated for the BAFTA Television Award for Best Male Comedy Performance, but lost out to Toby Jones for Detectorists.

The second series, The Trip to Italy, also received positive reviews. Review aggregator Rotten Tomatoes reports that 87% of 54 film critics have given the film a positive review, with a rating average of 7.3 out of 10. Stephanie Zacharek of The Village Voice wrote that The Trip to Italy "is basically more of the same Trip ... Now we know just what to expect from Coogan and Brydon, although as long as you're willing to settle in for the ride, that's not necessarily a bad thing." Scott Foundas of Variety found the series a "warmly enjoyable continuation of their improvised cultural and culinary adventures." William Goss of Film.com wrote: "Plenty enjoyable for fans of the first one, but by the end, it also has the consistency of reheated comfort food." Amber Wilkinson of The Daily Telegraph gave the film version of The Trip to Italy a grade B score, writing that Coogan and Brydon's "improvisation has been honed to the point where the jokes land solidly without losing naturalism and the pair of them are clearly enjoying la dolce vita."

A review article of the series was published in the online quarterly film journal Senses of Cinema in 2015, which reflects upon its relationships to poetry, the work of Walter Benjamin, allegory, tragedy, mourning, Italian neorealism, Romanticism, and The Gravediggers scene from Shakespeare's Hamlet. In 2019, The Trip was ranked 95th on The Guardian list of the 100 best TV shows of the 21st century.

International broadcast
In Australia, the programme was first screened Wednesday nights at 10:00pm on ABC1 starting on 14 December 2011, six months after the feature film edit of The Trip was released.

DVD releases
The first series of The Trip was released on 13 December 2010. The second series was released on 12 May 2014, as well as a boxset featuring all 12 TV episodes, and a boxset of the film versions.

References

External links
 
 BBC programme - The Trip To Italy
 
 
 Review article: ''The Trip' as Mourning Comedy at Senses of Cinema
 

2010s British comedy television series
2020s British sitcoms
2010 British television series debuts
2020 British television series endings
BBC television sitcoms
English-language television shows
Films directed by Michael Winterbottom
Television shows set in the Lake District
Television shows set in Italy
Television shows set in Lancashire
Television shows set in Spain
Television shows set in Yorkshire
Sky Atlantic original programming
Sky sitcoms